The Nauderer Hennesiglspitze is a mountain in the Ötztal Alps on the border between Tyrol, Austria, and South Tyrol, Italy.

References 
 Walter Klier: Alpenvereinsführer Ötztaler Alpen. Bergverlag Rudolf Rother, München 2006,

External links 

Mountains of the Alps
Mountains of Tyrol (state)
Mountains of South Tyrol
Alpine three-thousanders
Ötztal Alps
Austria–Italy border
International mountains of Europe